The 1891–92 Football Tournament was the 3rd staging of The Football Tournament.

The format was slightly unusual in that all games had to have a winner. Therefore, if the match was level after 90 minutes, extra time was played. If the match was still level after extra time, the match was replayed until a winner emerged. Ironically, no winner emerged in the end, as three teams finished level at 6 points with three wins each, and therefore no winner of the tournament was declared.

League standings

References

External links
RSSSF

1891–92 in Danish football
Top level Danish football league seasons
The Football Tournament seasons
Denmark